Kutubpur Union is a union parishad of Meherpur Sadar Upazila, in Meherpur District, Khulna Division of Bangladesh. There are 22 villages Chandpur, Uzalpr, Shubharajpur are one of them and 17 mouzas in the union.Kutubpur Union is a union located in Meherpur district in Bangladesh. With a population of approximately 60,000 people.

References

External links
 

Unions of Khulna Division
Unions of Meherpur Sadar Upazila
Unions of Meherpur District